is a city located in central Izu Peninsula in Shizuoka Prefecture, Japan. , the city had an estimated population of 30,678 in 13,390 households, and a population density of 84 persons per km2.

Geography
Izu is located in the north-central portion of the Izu Peninsula, and includes most of the Amagi Mountains. The region is hilly and some 80% of the city area is covered by forest. The Kano River runs through the city, which has a short coastline to the west on Suruga Bay of the Pacific Ocean. The area is part of the Izu-Tobu volcanic region, and is therefore subject to frequent earthquakes, and the city also has numerous hot springs as a result. Warmed by the Kuroshio Current, the area enjoys a warm maritime climate with hot, humid summers and mild, cool winters.

Surrounding municipalities
Shizuoka Prefecture
Numazu
Izunokuni
Itō
Higashiizu
Kawazu
Nishiizu

Demographics
Per Japanese census data, the population of Izu has been in decline over the past 60 years.

Climate
The city has a climate characterized by characterized by hot and humid summers, and relatively mild winters (Köppen climate classification Cfa).  The average annual temperature in Izu is 15.9 °C. The average annual rainfall is 2035 mm with September as the wettest month. The temperatures are highest on average in August, at around 26.5 °C, and lowest in January, at around 6.3 °C.

History
During the Edo period, most of Izu Province was tenryō territory under direct control of the Tokugawa shogunate, although portions near modern Shuzenji were under the control of the Ōkubo clan of Ogino-Yamanaka Domain.   During the establishment of the modern municipalities system in the early Meiji period in 1889, the area was reorganized into several villages under Kimisawa District, Shizuoka Prefecture. Kimisawa District merged with Tagata District in 1896.

Shuzenji became a town in 1924, followed by Toi in 1938, Nakaizu in 1958, and Amagiyugashima in 1960. The city of Izu was established on April 1, 2004, by the merger of the towns of Shuzenji, Toi, Nakaizu and Amagiyugashima (all from Tagata District).

Government
Izu has a mayor-council form of government with a directly elected mayor and a unicameral city legislature of 16 members.

Economy
The economy of the city of Izu is centered on tourism (primarily hot spring resorts), farming/forestry and commercial fishing. Izu is noted for its production of wasabi and shiitake. During the Edo period, the area was also known for its production of gold and other ores; however, the last commercial mining operations were closed in the 1960s.

Education
Izu has seven public elementary schools, four public middle schools and one combined elementary/middle school operated by the city government. The city has two public high schools operated by the Shizuoka Prefectural Board of Education.

Transportation

Railway
 Izuhakone Railway – Sunzu Line
–

Highway
 Izu-Jūkan Expressway

Local attractions
Shuzenji Romney Railway
Toi gold mine
Jōren Falls
Kamishiroiwa ruins, Jomon period settlement trace, National Historic Site

Sister city relations 
  – Nelson, British Columbia, Canada, from August 18, 2005
  – Hope, British Columbia, Canada, from August 18, 2005
  – Minamiminowa, Nagano, Japan, from February 25, 1991

Notable people from Izu
Naoko Ken – singer, actress
Yurika Hase (Yurika Ochiai) – voice actress
Sōsuke Kaise – manga artist
Hon'inbō Shūwa – professional go player

External links 

  
 Izushi Tourist Association

References

 
Cities in Shizuoka Prefecture
Populated coastal places in Japan